Kora may refer to:

Places

India
 Kora, Bardhaman, West Bengal
 Kora, Bharuch, Gujarat
 Korha, Katihar, also known as Kora, in Bihar
 Kora, Kendrapara, Odisha
 Kora, Wardha, Maharastra
 Kora, Tumakuru, Karnataka
 Toyaguda, Adilabad, Telangana, formerly called Kora

Elsewhere
 Kora, Burkina Faso, a town
 Kora, Ethiopia, a town
 Kureh, Markazi, a village in Markazi Province, Iran, also known as Kora
 Kōra, Shiga, a town in Shiga Prefecture, Japan
 Kora National Park, Coast Province, Kenya
 Kora, Mali, a village
 Kora, Jhelum, a village in Pakistan

Music
 Kora (instrument), a stringed musical instrument of West African origin
 Kora Awards, music awards for African music
 Kora (band), a New Zealand reggae band
 Kora (album), Kora album released in 2007
 Kora, a pseudonym of Polish rock singer Olga Jackowska

Buildings
 Kōra taisha, a Shinto shrine in Fukuoka prefecture, Japan
 Kora Temple, a Masonic building in Lewiston, Maine

Languages
 Kora or Aka-Kora language, formerly spoken in the Andaman Islands, India
 !Kora or Korana language, spoken in South Africa
 Kora or Koda language, spoken in India and Bangladesh

People
 Kora people, also Cora or Aka-Kora, an indigenous tribe of the Andaman Islands
 Kora (tribe), an indigenous tribe of India and Bangladesh
 Kora of Sicyon, first female artist for whom there is evidence
 Kora Boufflert (born 1966), French racewalker
 Kora Karvouni (born 1980), Greek stage and television actress
 Bil Aka Kora (born 1971), musician from Burkina Faso
 Kengo Kora (born 1987), Japanese actor
 Olga Jackowska (1951–2018), a Polish rock singer and songwriter known as Kora

Other uses
 Kora class corvette, a type of ship used by the Indian Navy
 INS Kora (P61), lead ship of the class
 Kora (pilgrimage), a type of pilgrimage in the Tibetan Buddhist tradition
 Made in Japan: Kora!, a 2011 Japanese film directed by Banmei Takahashi
 KORA-FM, a radio station in Bryan, Texas
 Kora (gastropod), genus of land snails
 Kora (FinTech), a pan-African payment infrastructure.

See also
 Kora kora, a traditional canoe in the Moluccas, Indonesia
 Koras or Kurash or Köräş, a wrestling sport of Central Asia
 Khôra, a Greek philosophical term or the territory of an Ancient Greek polis outside the city proper
 Cora (disambiguation)
 Possible variant or similar spellings of place names in India:
 Koda (disambiguation), variant spelling of Kora
 Korha (disambiguation)
 Korra (disambiguation)
 Khori (disambiguation)
 Khora (disambiguation)